Nitrogen tribromide is a chemical compound with the formula NBr3. It is extremely explosive in its pure form, even at −100 °C, and was not isolated until 1975. It is a deep-red and volatile solid.

Preparation 
NBr3 was first prepared by reaction of bistrimethylsilylbromamine (bis(trimethylsilyl)amine bromide) with bromine monochloride (with trimethylsilyl chloride as byproduct) at −87 °C according to the following equation:

(Me3Si)2NBr + 2 BrCl → NBr3 + 2 

where "Me" is a methyl group.

Reactions
Nitrogen tribromide reacts instantly with ammonia in dichloromethane solution at −87 °C to yield NBrH2.
NBr3 + 2 NH3 → 3 NH2Br

It also reacts with iodine in dichloromethane solution at −87 °C to produce NBr2I, which is a red-brown solid that stable up to -20 °C.
NBr3 + I2 → NBr2I + IBr

References

Inorganic amines
Bromides
Nitrogen halides
Substances discovered in the 1970s
Bromine(I) compounds